Tennis at the 2011 European Youth Summer Olympic Festival was held from 25 to 29 July 2011. The competitions took place at the Beşirli Court in Trabzon, Turkey. Boys and girls born 1996/1997 or later participated at following 2 disciplines for boys and 2 for girls.

Medal summary

Medal table

Medal events

See also
 European Youth Olympic Festival

References

External links
 Tennis results

European Youth Summer Olympic Festival
2011 European Youth Summer Olympic Festival
Tennis in Turkey
2011
2011 in Turkish tennis